The 2009 Brands Hatch Formula Two round was the fourth round of the 2009 FIA Formula Two Championship season. It was held on 18 and 19 July 2009 at Brands Hatch at Kent, United Kingdom. The first race was won by Philipp Eng, with Andy Soucek and Henry Surtees also on the podium. The second race was won by Andy Soucek, with Robert Wickens and Mikhail Aleshin also on the podium. The round was overshadowed by the fatal accident suffered by Henry Surtees in second race. Surtees was hit on the head by a wheel from the car of Jack Clarke after Clarke spun into the wall exiting Westfield Bend. The wheel broke its tether and bounced back across the track into the following group of cars and collided with Surtees' helmet. The car continued straight ahead into the barrier on the approach to Sheene Curve, also losing a wheel, and came to rest at the end of the curve with its remaining rear wheel still spinning. This indicated that Surtees had lost consciousness, with his foot still pressing the accelerator. Surtees was extricated from the car and taken to the circuit's medical centre, where he was stabilised before being transferred to the Royal London Hospital. His death was attributed to severe head injuries, inflicted by colliding with the wheel
rather than the following crash with the barriers, and was announced later that day.

Classification

Qualifying 1
Weather/Track: Cloud 19°/Dry 26°

Qualifying 2
Weather/Track: Sun 18°/Dry 28°

Race 1

Weather/Track: Sun 21°/Dry 33°

Race 2
Weather/Track: Cloud 18°/Damp 27°

Standings after the race
Drivers' Championship standings

References

FIA Formula Two Championship
Auto racing controversies